Francis Joseph Fitzgerald (12 April 1869 – 11 February 1911) was a Canadian who became a celebrated Boer War veteran and the first commander of the Royal North-West Mounted Police detachment at Herschel Island in the Western Arctic (1903). From December 1910 until February 1911, he led a mail patrol from Fort McPherson southward to Dawson City. When the patrol did not arrive in time, a search party, led by Corporal William Dempster, was sent from Dawson City and found the bodies of Fitzgerald and the other patrol members. The trip became known as "The Lost Patrol" and as "one of Yukon’s greatest tragedies."

See also 
 Military history of Nova Scotia
 History of Yukon

References

External links 

 Officer Down Memorial Page - RCMP

 Canadian Biography Online - Fitzgerald
 The Lost Patrol - Virtual Museum

1869 births
1911 deaths
Canadian military personnel of the Second Boer War
Canadian police officers killed in the line of duty
Disasters in Yukon
Military history of Nova Scotia
People from Halifax, Nova Scotia
Royal Canadian Mounted Police officers